A Latin cross or crux immissa is a type of cross in which the vertical beam sticks above the crossbeam, with the three upper arms either equally long or with the vertical topmost arm shorter than the two horizontal arms, and always with a much longer bottom arm.

If displayed upside down it is called St. Peter's Cross, because he was reputedly executed on this type of cross. When displayed sideways it is called St. Philip's cross for the same reason.

History

In a broad sense, the Latin cross is used to represent all of Christianity and Christendom, given that it teaches that Jesus sacrificed himself for humanity upon it, atoning for the sins of the world. It is especially used among the denominations of Western Christianity, including the Roman Catholic tradition and several Protestant traditions, such as Lutheranism, Moravianism, Anglicanism, Methodism, and Reformed Christianity, as well as by Anabaptists, Baptists, and Pentecostals. In certain periods, such as during the 16th century English Reformation of the Anglican Church, the Latin cross was disfavored by a minority of theologians such as Nicholas Ridley, though in the overall history of the Western Christian Churches, this was short-lived.

Cruciform churches

A Latin cross plan is a floor plan found in many Christian churches and cathedrals. When looked at from above or in plan view it takes the shape of a Latin cross (crux immissa). Such cruciform churches were very common in the West during the Romanesque period. The Latin cross plans have a nave with aisles or chapels, or both, and a transept that forms the arms of the cross. It also has at least one apse that traditionally faces east. Many also have a narthex at the entry.

In computer systems

The glyph has a unicode code point:

Similar marks

See also 
 Christian symbolism
 Christian cross
 Greek cross

References 

Christian crosses
Latin Church